Harmaja is an island and a lighthouse outside Helsinki, Finland.

Harmaja may also refer to:

 Harmaja (band), Finnish acoustic rock group
 Harmaja (album), a self-titled album by the Finnish acoustic rock group Harmaja
 Leo Harmaja (1880–1949), Finnish economist and Director General of the National Archives Service of Finland
 Saima Harmaja (1913–1937), Finnish poet and writer
 Tapani Harmaja (1917–1940), Finnish World War II pilot and writer
 Harri Harmaja (1944–), Finnish biologist and mycologist at the University of Helsinki.